Pichaqani (Aymara pichaqa, phichaqa, piqacha a big needle, -ni a suffix to indicate ownership, "the one with a big needle", Hispanicized spelling Pichacane) is a mountain in the Wansu mountain range in the Andes of Peru, about  high. It is situated in the Arequipa Region, La Unión Province, Puyca District. Pichaqani lies southwest of Qullpa and northwest of Qullpa K'uchu and Minasniyuq.

References 

Mountains of Arequipa Region